The Church of the Pantanassa or of the Dormition of the Theotokos (Ιερός Ναός Κοιμήσεως της Θεοτόκου) is the 10th-century katholikon of a now-vanished monastery in Monastiraki Square, between Athinas and Mitropoleos streets, facing the Monastiraki station, in central Athens, Greece. The church was known as the Great Monastery, and then later as monastiraki ("little monastery"), which eventually became the name of the whole area.

See also
 Tsisdarakis Mosque

References

External links 
 
 Pantanassa - Athens24 Guide
 Monastiraki Photo Guide

Christian monasteries in Greece
Byzantine church buildings in Athens
10th-century churches in Greece
10th-century establishments in the Byzantine Empire